Assumption of Mary Parish Church in Dekani is the parish church of the Parish of Dekani, a village near the city of Koper in southwest Slovenia. It was built in 1229, rebuilt towards the end of the 15th century, consecrated in 1493, and restored and enlarged in 1902.

References

Churches completed in 1229
13th-century Roman Catholic church buildings in Slovenia
City Municipality of Koper
Roman Catholic churches in the Slovene Littoral